The Tiger class were a class of three British warships of the 20th century and the last all-gun cruisers of the Royal Navy. Construction of three  cruisers (under the names Blake, Defence and Bellerophon) began during World War II, but, due to post-war austerity, the Korean War and focus on Royal Air Force over the surface fleet, the hulls remained unfinished. Approval to complete them to a modified design was given in November 1954, and the three ships – ,  and  – entered service from March 1959.

In January 1964, due to postponement of the Escort Cruiser programme, the cruisers were approved for conversion into helicopter-carrying cruisers. At first they were intended to carry four Westland Wessex helicopters for amphibious operations and anti-submarine protection operating "East of Suez" then four Westland Sea Kings for anti-submarine work. The conversion of Blake and Tiger, carried out between 1965 and 1972, was more expensive and time-consuming than expected, and, with the UK Treasury opposing each cruiser's conversion, the conversion of Lion was cancelled and she was scrapped in 1975, having been used for spares for her sister ships.

Often described and viewed in the Royal Navy as "hideous and useless hybrids", and with limited manpower, resources, and better ships available, Tiger and Blake were decommissioned in the late 1970s and placed in reserve.  Blake was scrapped in 1982 and Tiger in 1986.

Design and commissioning
HMS Defence, Bellerophon, Blake and Hawke were begun as Minotaur-class cruisers in 1941–43  with three triple 6-inch gun turrets in 1944. Defence, well advanced in construction, was placed in reserve without armament fitted and spent eight years moored offshore in Gareloch.

Development into the Tiger class
By 1944, the Minotaur class were widely viewed as obsolete. The added weight caused by the necessary addition of anti-aircraft guns, radar, electronics and the crew required to operate these, meant that they would exceed structural strength and deep-water stability limits. The design also lacked the speed and size of required for service in the Pacific or Arctic.

The Royal Navy's last wartime-built cruiser, Minotaur, was handed over on schedule to the RCN in June 1945. It was the first British cruiser with both Type 275/274 "lock and follow", air- and surface- fire control and quadruple 40 mm Bofors guns.

A proposal to sell two updated Tiger-class cruisers to the Royal Australian Navy (RAN) was approved by Winston Churchill in 1944. Despite the opposition of Australian shipbuilders and the Royal Australian Air Force, the Australian prime minister John Curtin agreed (on 18–21 May 1944, while visiting the UK) to the transfer of new RN ships, provided sufficient RAN crews were available to man them. Had the ships entered Australian service, they would have operated as part of British Pacific Fleet carrier groups. The RAN ships would have been re-armed with twin  gun turrets or triple 5.25-inch turrets. While the RAN strongly supported the purchase, elements of the Australian government perceived that they were being sold ships unwanted by the RN and preferred to support and expand local shipbuilding capacity. In addition, the Allied Supreme Commander, South West Pacific Area, US General Douglas MacArthur, recommended that Australia should prioritise air defence of its existing  bases and continue to rely on the wartime protection provided by the US Navy, rather than expanding the RAN fleet. Nevertheless, in February 1945, the Australian government's Defence Committee reaffirmed acceptance of two Tiger-class cruisers.

Unlike the Canadian transfer, the UK Treasury was not going to gift the cruisers to Australia. By mid-1945, the UK was facing severe constraints caused by Lend-Lease payments. Among other effects, this led in September 1945 to the cancellation of a batch of 25 US-built Mk 37 Type 275 radar-assisted gunnery systems, and this affected ships including the Tiger class. Nevertheless, the UK still wanted payment for the two Tiger vessels, or an equivalent writing-off of repairs on RN ships in Australian dockyards. On 11 April 1945, the UK priced the two ships at £9 million. In June 1945 the Australian government cancelled the transfer of payments for Defence and Blake, on the grounds that neither ship was ready and that it had insufficient crews for the cruisers because it was also acquiring British aircraft carriers and destroyers. This proposal was also rejected on the basis of redundancy, as the two County-class heavy cruisers already in Australian service, were deemed to have at least five years service life remaining. The Tiger-class was thus never adopted by the RAN.

In 1944–45, the RN had hoped that the new large  and  destroyers would be developed as substitutes for cruisers in many roles, but the First Sea Lord, Andrew Cunningham, realised that the UK budget could not support increasing the destroyer's size from 2,800 to 3,500 tons required for a three-turret ship with adequate anti-aircraft and anti-surface  fire control. With the  scrapped, the suspended ships were the only cruiser hull option and worth considering for rearmament. By 1946, nine Mk24dc turrets were 75–80% complete with three further turrets partially complete for use with either the Tiger or Neptune-class cruisers. These turrets were a more advanced version of the wartime Mk 23 triple . The new Mk 24 6-inch mounts were interim electric turrets with remote power-control and power-worked breech. The heavier Mk 24 offered a dual purpose gun with 60-degree elevation.

The Tiger design had a broader  beam than Superb on which to accommodate the larger turrets. But it was preferred to complete Superb with the older Mk 23 turrets in 1945, a 64 ft beam Swiftsure. The 1942 Tiger design was redesigned with better protection and internal division to take advantage of a three turret design with four 40 mm "Stabilized tachymetric anti-aircraft gun" mounts (STAAG) for close defence with Type 262 radar, Action Information centre, more pumps and generators.

By March 1944 Defence and Blake were all but signed off for transfer to the RAN to be completed as 5.25-inch gun cruisers. British production of 5.25 turrets was slow and little work was done on the cruisers other than to launch Defence in September 1944. The fact that they were years from commissioning guaranteed that Australia rejected the deal.

Another two Tiger-class cruisers were cancelled. Hawke was laid down in July 1943, and Bellerophon possibly had a keel laid down. Work on all the cruisers other than Superb stopped after mid-1944. It appears that the 1942 programme Hawke and Bellerophon were destroyed in 1944 and reordered as improved Town-class light cruiser and Neptune-class cruisers in February 1944 and February 1945.   The naval authorities of the time and through the Cold War hold that the Neptune class were under construction, the main and secondary twin  turrets, boilers and machinery for the first three ships ordered and being built in advance of the hull construction, as it was planned to get the first two s underway. At the end of the war it was thought Bellphorons hull was already under construction at Newcastle, but Hawke, an Improved Belfast with a  beam or the first Neptune was almost ready to launch in Portsmouth dockyard The more advanced of the two ships, Hawke, was broken up in 1947, a controversial decision as although she was still on the slip in the Portsmouth dockyard her boilers and machinery were complete and her new 6-inch guns close to completion.

The whole class, which was constructed with a tight, cramped, and near impossible to modernise citadel, was nearly superseded by the completely redesigned N2 8500-ton 1944 cruiser, within the same  box of the Colony/Minotaur design, which was approved by the Admiralty Board on 16 July 1943. Twenty four of twenty-five leading RN admirals and the Sea Lords favoured the N2 and preferred the lighter dual purpose 5.25 turrets; the incoming new First Sea Lord Cunningham disagreed believing 6-inch guns were essential. By 1944 the 5.25-inch RP10 was an improved gun and mount, compared with the 1942 version  and development of two prototype automatic 5.25-inch twin turrets continued at Vickers until 1948.

In 1948 the Royal Navy had proposed in "Ships of The Future Navy" to replace 23 cruisers and 58 fleet destroyers with 50 light cruisers with  Cruiser/Destroyers - four 5-inch guns, torpedoes, anti-submarine mortar and "good radar" on 4–5,000 tons displacement built to destroyer standards. The Admiralty offered the government two such proposals in 1951: a new broad beam Bellona class with four twin Mk 6 4.5-inch guns and an enlarged version of US  and s with British machinery and sensors with three single US 5-inch/54 and two twin US 3-inch/50-caliber guns.

The second Churchill government, elected in 1951, favoured the RAF and reduced the naval budget. With the RN priority being anti-submarine frigates, the restart of work on the Tiger cruisers was delayed by three years (as was any further cruiser reconstructions) to 1954.  The original decision to delay the Tigers in the late 1940s was to reassess cruiser design and the provision of effective anti-aircraft (AA) fire-control to engage jet aircraft which was beyond UK industrial capability at the time. Consequently, higher priority was given to the battleship , the Battle-class destroyers and the two new  aircraft carriers ( and ) for allocation of the 26 US-supplied medium-range anti-aircraft gun directors (which were delivered under Lend-Lease in 1944/5) The US supplied version of Type 275 High Altitude/Low Altitude DCT were stabilised and tracked multiple air targets of Mach 1.5+, the US directors were superior to the fragile UK version of Type 275, the only medium-range AA fire control until 1955, which could barely distinguish transonic targets at Mach 0.8. The 1947–49 period saw a peace dividend, and frigate construction became the priority in the Korean War.

By 1949 two alternative fits for the Tigers had been drawn up, one as anti-aircraft cruisers with six twin 3-inch 70 calibre and one with two twin QF 6-inch Mark N5 guns (Mark 26 automatic mountings) and three twin 3-inch/70s. Both were designed primarily for high-level anti-aircraft defence and largely intended as a replacement for the 5.25-inch and 4.5-inch turrets on  battleships and old fleet carriers. The rapid-fire auto twin 3-inch and 6-inch were designed on a post-war philosophy that the first 20 seconds of anti-jet aircraft and anti-missile engagement were critical and that the twin 3-inch firing at 240 rounds per minute would successfully engage six air targets in 20-second bursts. Sustained fire for naval gunfire support (NGS) was not a design requirement. The automatic twin 6-inch guns for the secondary role of defence and attack on trade also provided some very high level (up to 8-mile altitude) anti-aircraft capability. In historical terms, it represented a light armament and similar US weapons introduced on  had experienced considerable problems with jamming and had performed below expectation. A third lower-cost option of fitting two Mk 24 turrets in 'A' and 'B' positions and two to four semi-automatic Mk 6 twin 4.5-inch 'X' and 'Y' turrets and on the flanks was considered during the Korean War  as an immediate surface fighting  response to Sverdlov. However the 1945 Neptune-class Mk 24 6-inch turrets and Mk 6 4.5-inch mounts required a crew of 900+  But like the Colony-class in the 1950s, only one 6-inch turret would have been manned. However, as with the proposed 1951 Bellona Mk 2, the RN 4.5-inch DP was not a good postwar AA weapon. The six Mk 24 DC turrets were unfinished and complex, with two pairs of Type 274 and Type 275 directors. This confirms in late 1951 UK industry could still not build precision bearings or work to the fine tolerances needed for accurate naval AA fire and fire-control box components had to be ordered from the US. By 1953, US Mk 63 directors in the MRS 8 directors for close-in defence had been fitted at US expense in most major RN units and cruisers.  was reconstructed to a pattern very similar to that planned for HMS Hawke and the Tigers with 2/274 surface DCTs with the unreliable UK glasshouse 275 offset. On exercise AA firing Royalist easily outshot . DC wiring had been removed from the Tiger class in 1948 and the dated Mk 24 was not suitable for fast completion of the class  There was a strong desire that the new cruisers should have AC power, not DC or dual.

There was great doubt of the merits of completing the Tigers, given that Soviet Tupolev Tu-95 "Bear" turboprop and Tupolev Tu-16 "Badger" jet bombers flew faster and higher than anticipated which added to the argument for missile equipped-ships for anti-aircraft defence. The  6.9-inch armour and speed and range also outclassed the two turret Tigers. Even six-inch bombardment was increasingly unacceptable to the Royal Navy after Korea and was allowed only on the first day of Operation Musketeer after strong political opposition. The RN staff were completely divided over the development of new AA guns larger than 4-inch post war including Charles Lillicrap, the Director of Naval Construction in 1946 who saw the new 3-inch/70 as eliminating the need for the new Mk 26 DP 6 inch guns, as the auto twin 3/70 fulfilled the AA requirement   and advocating suspending cruiser design as much as lack of finance.  That and the fact the new twin 3-inch/70 and twin Mk 26 6-inch were six years from being tested led to both Tigers and Minotaurs being suspended in 1947, and slowed work on the new 6-inch and proposed new 5-inch guns. The proven Mk 23 seemed more than adequate and its efficiency was improved in the 1950s.

Revised design
In 1954 construction of the three ships was approved to the 1948 design mounting new automatic 6-inch and 3-inch guns. This was a controversial decision, made to avoid ordering larger cruisers or new aircraft carriers of questionable utility at immense cost and the apparent Soviet  threat. The Tigers lacked the deep water speed and armament to challenge the Russian ships, on paper, while other RN officers thought a couple of Darings or Type 41 frigate anti-aircraft frigates were all that was needed to challenge the inexperienced Russian crews. Cruisers were better deterred and sunk by aircraft carriers operating Hawker Sea Hawk and de Havilland Sea Venom strike aircraft.

The November 1954 cabinet meeting deciding the fate of the Royal Navy took six hours. Churchill was determined to limit the defence budget with a view to developing nuclear weapons and less vulnerable RAF aircraft. The cheaper Tigers were approved in 1954, the Royal Navy estimating completion in three years for £6 million compared with five years and £12m for a new cruiser design. The new automatic twin 6-inch and twin 3-inch dual-purpose guns designed for larger cruisers like the Minotaur were approved for production. The modernised Tigers were an interim measure with the expectation that guided missile equipped ships were "at least ten years away".

While outwardly identical, the three Tigers were each very different in their electrics. Blake was essentially an experimental cruiser with all-electric turrets able to engage Mach 2.5 air targets but was put in reserve in 1963 for lack of technical staff.  had deteriorated after eight years in Gareloch before reconstruction as a Tiger and had to be withdrawn from operations "East of Suez" in 1963 due to boiler, mechanical and armament problems. While the electric 3/70 AA systems were excellent they required intensive maintenance and excessive manpower and fitters, the Twin  Mk 26 six inch auto guns were a 'disaster' constantly jamming and rarely fillfilling their basic 30 sec burst fire min capability     HMNZS , with some Royal Navy crew, was reactivated as a surface escort for carrier groups in Southeast Asia in 1964 to deter the threat of the Sverdlov cruiser bought by Indonesia and in 1965 to support the amphibious carriers with air defence and general fleet support. By 1966 Royalist, like Blake and Lion, was unsustainable in the year of the confrontation with Indonesia. The large s were refitted (from 1961) with MRS3 fire-control to provide a substitute for the Tigers; their three turrets giving them an advantage over the Tiger.

Conversions

By 1964 the Conservative Government and half the naval staff saw the Tigers as no longer affordable or credible in the surface combat or fleet air defence role and would have preferred to decommission them but given they were technically only three years old and built at immense expense, scrapping them was politically difficult. 

There were financial pressures in the RN due to the cost of the planned CVA-01 aircraft carriers and the Escort Cruiser programme (four helicopter carrier vessels each armed with Sea Dart and Ikara  operating four "Chinook type" helicopters and having emergency accommodation for 700 troops). Cancellation of the last four of the ten planned County-class destroyers and moving two or three of the Tigers to operational reserve would offset the Escort cruiser cost and replacing the Tigers or fully funded the more 'conventional cruisers, intended as replacement ships in 1960   (a) modified versions of the County class DDG built to the same hull dimensions and armament without Seaslug, to carry 4-6 Wessex helicopters or (b) the variant models of the County DDG proposed by the RAN or (3) An enlarged version of the County design built to cruiser standards with additional workshops, parts and stores caried and some armor protection with provision for 3 Wessex and the USN Tartar system. However, the decision to build Britain's nuclear missile submarines meant the Escort cruisers proposal was postponed, with budget pressure and the fact both the available Vickers design teams and RN own available naval architects were now employed on SSBN work (there was also division over whether the Escort cruisers would be small helicopter carrier cruisers or developed Type 82 missile cruisers for operation East of Suez). Though the Escort cruisers were deferred, the requirement remained and conversion of the Tigers  was identified as the quickest solution in 1963. Conversion into helicopter carriers carrying Westland Wessex helicopters for Royal Marine Commando or anti-submarine work East of Suez was approved on 24 January 1964. 

A large hangar replaced the 'Y' turret, the forward turrets were retained for shore bombardment and anti-surface vessel work. Intended to provide extra powerful vessels to support and conduct amphibious operations east of Suez where it was difficult logistically for the Royal Navy to sustain even one operational carrier and one commando carrier in 1963–64. The original plan retained the three twin 3-inch mounts with an updated sonar and radar including Type 965 and replacing the Type 992 target indicator radar with the Type 993. British Army preference in 1964 with the Indonesian confrontation building was to retain the Tigers with their 6-inch guns for shore bombardment.

Three configurations (schemes X, Y, and Z) were considered in 1965 for the conversion to helicopter carriers. X had deck space for one helicopter and a hangar for three at the cost of the rear 6-inch turret and no maintenance space, Y gave deck space for two Wessex helicopters (only one landing or taking off at a time) and hangar for four at the cost of removing the 6-inch and 3-inch armament aft, Z was same deck space and hangar capacity as Y but two helicopters could take off (or land) at once with 6-inch and 3-inch mounts removed. Z was chosen as the best option even for a projected six-year lifespan and expected to take 15 months and cost £2 million per ship.  The work would take place at the same time as refit  - predicted as 15 months. The final cost was £12 million for all three (conversion and refit) and £10.5 million for the helicopters. It was recognised that 75 pilots would also be needed at a time when the FAA was already 37 pilots short.

To avoid the political problem of scrapping new cruisers as well as the aircraft carriers, the Labour Government elected in October 1964 decided to retain large ships for command and flagship roles and accepted the RN and MoD argument that three Tiger cruisers would replace the anti-submarine warfare role previously provided by aircraft carriers. At the time the Royal Navy was mostly concentrated on east of Suez operations and the anti-submarine deterrent role was to counter slow Indonesian and Chinese diesel-powered submarines. In theory, even one Tiger could threaten the use of nuclear depth charges and free up space on aircraft carriers for strike and air combat aircraft.

The government continued the conversion of Tiger and Blake after deciding on further ship cuts and a faster phase-out of carriers in 1968. During the conversion of Blake, the plan was changed to allow the cruisers to operate four more capable Westland Sea King helicopters, although only three Sea Kings could actually ever be accommodated and serviced in the new longer hangar, which forced the replacement of the side 3-inch gun mounts with less effective Seacat guided weapon system. The low priority given to deterrence of Soviet submarines in the Northern Atlantic by the MoD is reflected in the decision to convert a suitable anti-submarine helicopter platform, the carrier Hermes into an amphibious carrier. The later advent of the s would seem to add weight to this proposal. Hermes and Bulwark were larger, and offered more hangar capacity. The government's priority was to arm aircraft in West Germany with tactical and thermonuclear weapons.

The proposed class of four large Type 82 destroyers (planned to accompany the CVA-01 aircraft carriers) fitted with nuclear Ikara anti-submarine missiles could have been a more reliable nuclear deterrent, but the Ikara was ultimately fitted only to carry conventional Mark 46 torpedoes and due to the 1966 Defence White Paper only one Type 82 air defence destroyer, was built as a testbed for the weapon technologies. Bristol lacked a helicopter hangar, and was plagued by problems common with dated and complex steam propulsion.

With no other options, work began to convert Blake to a helicopter cruiser in 1965 and Tiger in 1968. The structural modernisation work on the hulls was difficult and expensive. However, the ships successfully served as helicopter command cruisers and provided an argument to justify the construction of their replacement, the Invincible-class "through deck cruisers". Lions conversion was cancelled due to delays and other workload in the dockyards.
By 1969, it was obvious that Blakes conversion was unsatisfactory. Lion remained operational until late 1965, when she was placed in reserve and used as a parts source for the conversion of Tiger and she was sold for breaking up in 1975.  The conversions left Tiger and Blake some 380 tons heavier with a full displacement of 12,080 tons and their crew complements increased by 169 to 885. Originally. Blakes conversion had been more expensive than envisaged (£5.5 million) and Tigers £13.25 million, due to the level of inflation at the time.

Obsolescence and decommissioning

Blake returned to service in 1969 and Tiger in 1972, using Lion for spares before she was scrapped in 1975.  Cutbacks in Royal Navy funding and manpower, under the new Conservative government and the belief in the Hawker Siddeley Nimrod maritime patrol aircraft and submarines for anti-submarine operations, reduced the need for the class.  The recommissioning of the carrier  and conversion of  into a helicopter carrier, then anti-submarine carrier meant that they could carry twice as many Sea Kings as the Tigers further decreased their importance.  In April 1978, Tiger was withdrawn from service, followed by Blake in 1979; both ships were laid up in reserve at Chatham Dockyard. When Blake was decommissioned in 1979, she was the last cruiser to serve in the Royal Navy and her passing was marked on 6 December 1979 when she fired her main guns for the last time in the English Channel.

During the Falklands War, Blake and Tiger were surveyed to determine their condition for reactivation. The survey determined both ships to be in good condition and they were put into dry-dock, Blake at Chatham, Tiger at Portsmouth. By mid-May, it was determined that the ships would not be completed in time to take part in the war and work ceased.

Chile showed interest in acquiring both ships, the sale did not proceed and the ships sat at anchor. Blake was sold for breaking up in late 1982 and Tiger in 1986.

Ships of the class

Notes

Citations

References

External links

 
 Tiger-class cruisers
 Tiger class at Uboat.net

 

 
Cruiser classes
Helicopter carrier classes
Ship classes of the Royal Navy